Kwak Dong-yeon (born 19 March 1997), is a South Korean actor and musician. He made his acting debut in the television series My Husband Got a Family in 2012 for which he received Best Young Actor Award at the Korea Drama Awards. He then starred in Adolescence Medley (2013),  Modern Farmer (2014) and in 2016, gained recognition with historical drama Love in the Moonlight. He is also well known for his roles in Gangnam Beauty (2018), My Strange Hero (2018), Never Twice (2019), Vincenzo (2021), and Big Mouth (2022).

Early life and education 
Kwak was born on 19 March 1997 in Daejeon, South Korea, the younger of two siblings.

At 13, he permanently moved to Seoul by himself to pursue his dream to be an artist. He has been studying music at FNC Academy since 2010, and also took acting lessons. In February 2013, he graduated from Munrae Junior High School and graduated from School of Performing Arts Seoul in February 2016.

Career

2012–2015: Beginnings 
Kwak was originally a lead guitarist and vocalist of Kokoma Band (literally, "Little Kids' Band"), a trainee band managed by FNC Entertainment.

He made his acting debut in 2012, appearing in the KBS television series My Husband Got a Family. The drama reached a peak audience rating of 49.6%, thereby earning the "national drama" status. The series ranked number one overall on the 2012 yearly TV ratings chart. For his performance, Kwak won the Best Young Actor Award at the 2012 Korea Drama Awards.

In 2013, he featured as young Prince Dong-pyung in the SBS historical drama Jang Ok-jung, Living by Love.
He then starred in the KBS Drama Special Adolescence Medley, a coming-of-age drama based on the webtoon of the same name. 
The same year, Kwak featured in the KBS period drama Inspiring Generation playing the younger version of Kim Hyun-joong's character. His portrayal of a boy who struggled as the head of the family from an early age to fill the father's vacancy, garnered him a nomination at the 16th Seoul International Youth Film Festival for the Best Young Actor Award.

In March 2014, he took on the lead role in KBS Drama Special Middle School Girl A where he portrayed a smart transfer student who got bullied in his new school. He then starred in SBS weekend drama Modern Farmer, playing a drummer of a rock band who later moved to a village to be a farmer. In December 2014, Kwak's performances in the drama Inspiring Generation and the drama special Middle School Student A won him the Best Young Actor Award in the 2014 KBS Drama Awards.

In 2015, Kwak starred alongside Sistar's Bora in the web series The Flatterer, based on a webtoon of the same name. He portrayed Park Gun, an underdog high school student struggling to survive among the strong in a realistic and comical way. He also starred in a KBS2 Drama Special Avici, playing the role of a model student from an elite high school, but lacks the ability to empathize with others' pain, who tried his best to cover up his mom's murder.

2016–present: Rising popularity 
In 2016, he gained more recognition after co-starring in the hit KBS2 historical series Love in the Moonlight as a skilled swordsman known as Kim Byung-yeon. The role earned him a nomination for the Best New Actor at the 2016 KBS Drama Awards, and the 10th Korea Drama Awards. In 2017, Kwak made a guest appearance in drama Fight for my way, as Kim Ji-won's ex-boyfriend, and played a supporting role in SBS fantasy romance drama Reunited Worlds.

In July 2017, Kwak was cast as Michael, the main protagonist in the Korean adaptation of The Elephant Song play, which ran from September 6 to November 26 at the former Suhyeonjae Theater in Seoul.

In 2017, Kwak starred as the main protagonist in a KBS2 drama special Slow. His portrayal of a frustrated baseball player "who fell into a slump, and was anxious about an uncertain future", garnered him a nomination for the Best Actor in a One-Act/Special/Short Drama Award at the 2017 KBS Drama Awards.

On 27 November 2017, Kwak carried the Olympics flame for the 2018 Pyeongchang Games in Gokseong, South Jeolla province as part of the torch relay.

In 2018, he joined the cast of KBS romance drama Radio Romance, playing the role of a psychiatrist who is Ji Soo-ho (Yoon Doo-joon)'s high school classmate and personal doctor. He also starred in JTBC's romantic comedy series Gangnam Beauty, which was a hit and gained renewed recognition for Kwak. He then starred in SBS's romantic comedy drama My Strange Hero, which is Kwak's first villain role following his debut. The role earned him a nomination for the Excellence Award, Actor in a Miniseries at the 2019 SBS Drama Awards.

In December 2018, he won the Actor Award at the 2019 Korea First Brand Awards.

In 2019, Kwak made a special appearance in SBS drama Doctor Detective, portraying Jung Ha-rang, a screen door service engineer from a vocational high school, who was destroyed by an industrial accident. Later in the same year, Kwak starred in the family drama Never Twice. He acted as the lead male role there with actress Park Se-wan. He played the role of Na Hae-jun, the heir of a five-star hotel. The performance earned him a nomination for the Excellence Award, Actor in a Weekend Drama at the 2019 MBC Drama Awards, and for the Excellent Award, Actor in Serial Drama at the 7th APAN Star Awards.

In October 2019, Kwak reprised his role in The Elephant Song, from 22 November 2019 to 16 February 2020.

In 2020, he appeared in sports film Baseball Girl. He also made a special appearance in the tvN drama It's Okay to Not Be Okay. Kwak takes on the role of a manic patient with exhibitionism in the drama. In June 2020, it was announced that Kwak would be a part of the cast in the Korean adaptation of the musical comedy Something Rotten!. He played the role of Nigel Bottom, a genius playwright who is also pure and passionate. The performance earned him a nomination for the Rookie of the Year Award, Male category at the 5th Korea Musical Awards. The play ran from August 7 to October 18 at the Chungmu Art Center Grand Theater. In August 2020, Kwak signed with new agency H& Entertainment after leaving FNC Entertainment.

In February 2021, Kwak starred in tvN television series Vincenzo. He played the role of Jang Han-seo, the half-brother of Jang Jun-woo portrayed by Taecyeon, who publicly acts as chairman in his brother's place. In May 2021, Kwak joined SBS variety show Delicious Rendezvous along with Choi Won-young and Choi Ye-bin.

In 2022, Kwak appeared in the movie 6/45 as an observer in the South Korean front force and in the MBC drama Big Mouth as a convicted scammer called Jerry.

Personal life 
On 26 February 2014, not long after Kwak finished his Inspiring Generation drama promotion, his mother died of an illness.

Filmography

Film

Television series

Web series

Television show

Web shows

Music video

Radio Shows

Theatre

Awards and nominations

References

External links
 
 
 

1997 births
Living people
People from Daejeon
21st-century South Korean singers
South Korean male film actors
South Korean male television actors
South Korean musicians
South Korean guitarists
School of Performing Arts Seoul alumni
21st-century guitarists